Miguel Armando Ubeto Aponte (born 2 September 1976 in Caracas) is a Venezuelan road racing cyclist. He turned professional in 2012 with  before signing with the UCI World Tour team  for 2013. In 2011 he won the UCI America Tour.

Career
In May 2013, Ubeto was provisionally suspended for an adverse finding of GW501516. He was later banned for two years, before being reduced to 14 months.

Following this suspension, Ubeto won the gold medal in the road race at the 2015 Pan American Games in Toronto, Canada.

On 7 July 2018, while riding for the team "Venezuela País de Futuro", Ubeto won the 3rd stage in the Vuelta a Venezuela. On 1 August 2018, Ubeto was provisionally suspended by the UCI for "Use of Prohibited Methods and/or Prohibited Substances", serving a further ban.

Major results

1998
 2nd  Team pursuit, Central American and Caribbean Games
2002
 Vuelta a la Independencia Nacional
1st Stages 1 & 3
 3rd  Madison, Central American and Caribbean Games
2004
 1st Stage 2 Vuelta al Táchira
 2nd Overall Tour de Guadeloupe
 3rd  Road race, Pan American Road Championships
 10th Overall Vuelta a Cuba
2005
 1st Clasico Ciudad de Caracas
 1st Stage 13 Vuelta a Venezuela
 6th Road race, Pan American Road Championships
2007
 1st Stage 4 Vuelta a la Independencia Nacional
 1st Stage 3 Vuelta Internacional al Estado Trujillo
 1st Stage 2 Vuelta a Venezuela
 8th Overall Tour de Guadeloupe
2008
 8th Overall Vuelta a Cuba
2009
 1st Stage 1 Vuelta al Táchira
 2nd Overall Tour de Guadeloupe
2010
 Vuelta al Táchira
1st Stages 1 (TTT), 2 & 5
 1st Stage 1 Vuelta a Cuba
 9th Overall Tour de Guadeloupe
1st Stages 2b (TTT) & 8a
2011
 1st 2010–11 UCI America Tour
 1st  Road race, National Road Championships
 1st Clasico Corre Por La Vida
 Vuelta al Táchira
1st Stages 3 & 7
 Vuelta a Venezuela
1st Stages 4b & 10
 2nd  Road race, Pan American Games
 5th Overall Tour de Guadeloupe
1st Stage 2b
 7th Overall Vuelta a la Independencia Nacional
2012
 1st  Road race, National Road Championships
 1st Overall Vuelta a Venezuela
 1st Stage 1 Vuelta al Táchira
 6th Road race, Pan American Road Championships
2015
 1st  Road race, Pan American Games
 1st Clasico FVCiclismo Corre Por la VIDA
 2nd Road race, National Road Championships
 4th Copa Federación Venezolana de Ciclismo
2017
 1st  Road race, National Road Championships
 8th Overall Tour de Guadeloupe
2018
 1st Stage 3 Vuelta a Venezuela
2021
 1st Stage 3 Vuelta a Venezuela

Notes

References

External links
 
 
 
 
 
 
 

1976 births
Living people
Venezuelan male cyclists
Olympic cyclists of Venezuela
Cyclists at the 2012 Summer Olympics
Cyclists at the 2016 Summer Olympics
Pan American Games medalists in cycling
Pan American Games gold medalists for Venezuela
Pan American Games silver medalists for Venezuela
Cyclists at the 1999 Pan American Games
Cyclists at the 2011 Pan American Games
Cyclists at the 2015 Pan American Games
Medalists at the 2011 Pan American Games
Medalists at the 2015 Pan American Games
Central American and Caribbean Games medalists in cycling
Central American and Caribbean Games silver medalists for Venezuela
Central American and Caribbean Games bronze medalists for Venezuela
Competitors at the 1998 Central American and Caribbean Games
Competitors at the 2002 Central American and Caribbean Games
Competitors at the 2006 Central American and Caribbean Games
Vuelta a Venezuela stage winners
Tour de Guadeloupe stage winners
Sportspeople from Caracas
Venezuelan sportspeople in doping cases
Doping cases in cycling
21st-century Venezuelan people